Clematis mandshurica is a species of Clematis growing in North Eastern China.

References

mandshurica